In the United States, a technical school is a type of two-year college that covers specialized fields such as business, finance, hospitality, tourism, construction, engineering, visual arts, information technology and community work.

Associations supporting technical schools
The Association for Career and Technical Education is the largest U.S. education association dedicated to promoting career and technical education.

United States military
Technical school is also the term used in the United States Armed Forces for the job specific training given immediately after recruit training. Though similar to the training provided by a two-year college, the training is much more concise, eschewing any coursework outside the minimum necessary to begin working in the chosen career field; additionally, the training is more time intensive, often including more than nine in-class hours per day. Military technical school is typically one to three months in duration, though some schools are as short as two weeks or as long as two years.

Upon graduation, military technical school recruits are qualified only as apprentices and must work under supervision until they have completed a more extensive on-the-job training program. Many times, the military training can be converted to standard university credits, leaving the graduating recruit with only a few general education requirement courses (such as speech or composition) to complete in order to receive the more traditional two-year technical school diploma referenced above.

See also

Secondary technical school – an obsolete type of school in the United Kingdom
Technical and further education (Australia)
Technikum (Polish education)

References

Citations
 Vocational Education in the United States: Toward the Year 2000 US National Center for Education Statistics

External links
Career College Association website
Association of Career and Technical Education (ACTE)
Career College Industry website